Nusach Sefard, Nusach Sepharad, or Nusach Sfard is the name for various forms of the Jewish siddurim, designed to reconcile Ashkenazi customs ( "Custom", pl. minhagim) with the kabbalistic customs of Isaac Luria. To this end it has incorporated the wording of Nusach Edot haMizrach, the prayer book of Sephardi Jews, into certain prayers. Nusach Sefard is used nearly universally by Hasidim, as well as by some other Ashkenazi Jews but has not gained significant acceptance by Sephardi Jews. Some Hasidic dynasties use their own version of the Nusach Sefard siddur, sometimes with notable divergence between different versions.

Prayers and customs
Some versions are nearly identical to Nusach Ashkenaz, while others come far closer to Nusach Edot Mizrach: most versions fall somewhere in between. All versions attempt to incorporate the customs of Isaac Luria, with greater or lesser success.

History

It is generally held that every Jew is bound to observe the mitzvot (commandments of Judaism) by following the customs appropriate to his or her family origin. For this reason a number of rabbis disapprove of the adoption of Nusach Sefard by Ashkenazi Jews.

However, it was a common kabbalistic belief that the Sephardic rite, especially in the form used by Isaac Luria, had more spiritual potency than the Ashkenazi. Many Eastern Jewish communities, such as the Persian Jews and the Shami Yemenites, accordingly adopted the Sephardic rite with Lurianic additions in preference to their previous traditional rites. In the same way, in the seventeenth and eighteenth centuries many Kabbalistic groups in Europe adopted the Lurianic-Sephardic rite in preference to the Ashkenazi. This was however the custom of very restricted circles, and did not come into widespread public use until the rise of middle to late 18th-century Hasidism.

Luria taught that twelve gates of prayer exists, corresponding to the twelve tribes of ancient Israel (and to the twelve Jewish communities that existed in Safed in his lifetime), and that twelve nusachs for Jewish prayer (nasachot ha-tefillah) emanated accordingly.

In alteration of this Lurianic concept, especially in 18th/19th-century Hasidic Judaism the claim emerged that, while in general one should keep to one's minhag of origin, the Nusach Sefard reached a believed "thirteenth gate" (Shaar ha-Kollel) in Heaven for those who do not know their own tribe. Nusach Sefard, with its variant Nusach Ari, became almost universal among Hasidic Jews, as well as some other Ashkenazi Jews, but has not gained significant acceptance by Sephardi Jews. One consequence of this was that, before the foundation of the State of Israel and in the early years of the State, it was the predominant rite used by Ashkenazim in the Holy Land, with the exception of certain pockets of traditional Lithuanian Jews. One reason for this was that the Land of Israel was regarded as part of the Sephardic world, so that it was felt that new immigrants should adapt to the local rite. In recent decades, following the immigration of many Ashkenazi Jews from America, the traditional millennia-old Ashkenazi rite has regained a strong following. Today the various sects and dynasties of Hasidic Judaism each use their own idiosyncratic version of Nusach Sfard.

Variants
Many Hasidic groups have slightly varying versions.
A significant difference compared to nusach ashkenazi resides in the kaddish. Indeed, for example, Nusach Sfard adds "", which is an heritage from the Sephardic kaddish.

Nusach Maharitz
Nusach Maharitz, referring to and originating with Rabbi Yosef Tzvi Dushinsky, is the nusach used by most Dushinsky Hasidim. The nusach is a mixture of Nusach Ashkenaz and Nusach Sefard, differing from Nusach Ashkenaz only when it can be proven from the writings of the students of the Ari that he did otherwise, yielding a blend of elements from both rites almost equally.

References

External links
 Seder Or le-Yisrael, Zhitomir 1865 (prayer book)
 Zimmels, Ashkenazim and Sephardim: their Relations, Differences, and Problems As Reflected in the Rabbinical Responsa: London 1958 (since reprinted).  
 Remer, Daniel, Siddur and Sefer Tefillat Ḥayim: Jerusalem 2003 (Hebrew only: reconstructs Lurianic rite from Venice edition of Spanish and Portuguese prayer book and the Sha'ar ha-Kavvanot of Ḥayim Vital; companion volume discusses Ḥasidic variants)
 A Modern Reconstruction of the Ari's Siddur
 Wertheim, Aaron, Law and Custom in Hasidism, Ktav Publishing House, Inc. Hoboken, NJ, 1992, p146
 The Difference Between Sephardic Nusach and Nusach Sefard

Ashkenazi Jews topics
Hasidic Judaism
Isaac Luria
Nusachs